Xanthophyllum longum is a tree in the family Polygalaceae. The specific epithet  is from the Latin meaning "long", referring to the petioles.

Description
The bark is pale greenish or blackish.

Distribution and habitat
Xanthophyllum longum is endemic to Borneo and known only from Sabah. Its habitat is lowland forests.

References

longum
Endemic flora of Borneo
Trees of Borneo
Flora of Sabah
Plants described in 2005